Itmaharela is a genus of moths of the family Noctuidae.

This is a replacement name by Nye (1975) for the preoccupied genus Harmatelia (Moore). Lödl & Paumkirchner transferred this genus to Hypeninae in 2001.

At present, there is only one species in this genus: Itmaharela basalis Moore, 1882 that is known from India and Taiwan.

References

Moths of Asia
Moths of Taiwan
Hypeninae
Monotypic moth genera